William Robert Herman (May 17, 1924 – June 13, 2010) was a professional basketball player who spent one season in the National Basketball Association (NBA) as a member of the Denver Nuggets during the 1949–50 season. He attended Mount Union College.

External links
 

1924 births
2010 deaths
American men's basketball players
Basketball players from Ohio
Denver Nuggets (1948–1950) players
Mount Union Purple Raiders men's basketball players